Stara Bircza  is a village in the administrative district of Gmina Bircza, within Przemyśl County, Podkarpackie Voivodeship, in south-eastern Poland.

References

Stara Bircza